Asioligochaetus is a genus of flies in the family Dolichopodidae. It contains only one species, Asioligochaetus vlasovi, which is distributed in Central Asia. The genus was originally proposed as a subgenus of Medetera by Oleg Negrobov in 1966. Because of its peculiar combination of characters, it was raised to genus rank by Igor Grichanov in 2009.

References

Dolichopodidae genera
Medeterinae
Diptera of Asia
Monotypic Diptera genera